Penn Township may refer to the following townships in the United States:

Illinois
 Penn Township, Shelby County, Illinois
 Penn Township, Stark County, Illinois

Indiana
 Penn Township, Jay County, Indiana
 Penn Township, Parke County, Indiana
 Penn Township, St. Joseph County, Indiana

Iowa
 Penn Township, Guthrie County, Iowa
 Penn Township, Jefferson County, Iowa
 Penn Township, Johnson County, Iowa
 Penn Township, Madison County, Iowa

Kansas
 Penn Township, Osborne County, Kansas

Michigan
 Penn Township, Michigan

Minnesota
 Penn Township, McLeod County, Minnesota

Missouri
 Penn Township, Sullivan County, Missouri

Ohio
 Penn Township, Highland County, Ohio
 Penn Township, Morgan County, Ohio

Oklahoma
 Penn Township, Woods County, Oklahoma
 Penn Township, Woodward County, Oklahoma

Pennsylvania
 Penn Township, Berks County, Pennsylvania
 Penn Township, Butler County, Pennsylvania
 Penn Township, Centre County, Pennsylvania
 Penn Township, Chester County, Pennsylvania
 Penn Township, Clearfield County, Pennsylvania
 Penn Township, Cumberland County, Pennsylvania
 Penn Township, Huntingdon County, Pennsylvania
 Penn Township, Lancaster County, Pennsylvania
 Penn Township, Lycoming County, Pennsylvania
 Penn Township, Perry County, Pennsylvania
 Penn Township, Philadelphia County, Pennsylvania, defunct, now part of Philadelphia
 Penn Township, Snyder County, Pennsylvania
 Penn Township, York County, Pennsylvania

See also 
 East Penn Township, Pennsylvania
 Penn Forest Township, Pennsylvania
 Penn Hills, Pennsylvania
 West Penn Township, Pennsylvania

 Penn (disambiguation)

Township name disambiguation pages